Alucita japonica is a moth of the family Alucitidae. It is found in Japan.

References

Moths described in 1931
Alucitidae
Moths of Japan
Taxa named by Shōnen Matsumura